Francis, Day & Hunter is a British music publishing company, one of the leading publishers of music hall songs and popular music in the late 19th and 20th centuries. It was established in London in 1877 as W. & J. Francis and Day, later Francis Brothers & Day, becoming Francis, Day & Hunter in 1880. It became a subsidiary of EMI Publishing in 1972.

History

From 1873, the brothers William and James Francis, who worked for the piano manufacturers and music publishers Chappell & Co., were members of leading London music hall ensemble the Mohawk Minstrels. Harry Hunter (1840–1906), the lead performer and lyricist with rival group the Manhattan Minstrels, joined the Mohawks in 1874. The Francis brothers began printing booklets setting out the words of their songs, to encourage audiences to join in with the choruses. In 1877, together with David Day (1850–1929), who had worked for another publishing company, Hopwood and Crew, they set up their own company to publish their songs, including those written by Hunter and others. In 1880, Hunter became a named partner in the business.

Originally based in Oxford Street, the company moved to Charing Cross Road in 1897, becoming one of the founding businesses of London's "Tin Pan Alley".  David Day formed the Musical Copyright Association in 1900 to protect publishers against sheet music piracy. His son Frederick Day (1878–1975) was acknowledged as one of the driving forces behind the 1911 Copyright Act, which protected the rights of authors and composers.

Under the leadership of David Day and later Fred Day, the company expanded rapidly through the first half of the 20th century, becoming one of the leading British music publishers and one of the largest in the world, responsible for publishing the works of many Broadway composers including Jerome Kern, George Gershwin, and Cole Porter. The company opened offices in New York City, Paris and Berlin. In 1908, Francis, Day & Hunter bought a one-third share in the leading New York music publishing company T.B. Harms, but sold their share in the business in 1920. The firm purchased B. Feldman & Co., one of its main competitors, in 1945, but was itself merged into EMI Music Publishing Ltd. in 1972.

The David Day Memorial Scholarship was set up at the Royal Central School of Speech & Drama in London, in memory of the company's co-founder.

References

1877 establishments in England
1972 disestablishments in England
British companies established in 1877
British companies disestablished in 1972
Publishing companies established in 1877
Music publishing companies of the United Kingdom
Defunct companies based in London